The 2022 East Renfrewshire Council election took place on 5 May 2022 on the same day as the 31 other Scottish local government elections. The election used the 5 wards created under the Local Governance (Scotland) Act 2004, with 18 councillors being elected. Each ward elected either 3 or 4 members, using the STV electoral system.

At the last election in 2017, the Conservatives won the most seats, but a coalition administration was formed between the SNP and Labour.

Background

Composition

Changes since 2017

Barrhead, Liboside & Uplawmoor Conservative Cllr Paul Aitken resigned from the Scottish Conservatives and became an Independent on 22 January 2018.

Clarkston, Netherlee & Williamwood Conservative Cllr Stewart Miller resigned from the Scottish Conservatives and became an Independent on 10 September 2020.

Results

Ward summary

|- class="unsortable" align="centre"
! rowspan="2" style="text-align:left;"|Ward
! % 
!Cllrs
! %
!Cllrs
! %
!Cllrs
! %
!Cllrs
! %
!Cllrs
!rowspan=2|TotalCllrs
|- class="unsortable" style="text-align:center;"
!colspan=2 bgcolor=""|SNP
!colspan=2 bgcolor=""|Labour
!colspan=2 bgcolor=""|Conservative
!colspan=2 bgcolor=""|Independent
! colspan="2" style="background:white;"| Others
|-
|align="left"|Barrhead, Liboside and Uplawmoor
| style="background:#efe146;"|33.4
| style="background:#efe146;"|2
|20.1
|1
|10.7
|0
|31.1
|1
|4.5
|0
|4
|-
|align="left"|Newton Mearns North and Neilston
|32.1
|1
|25.4
|1
| style="background:lightblue;"|34.5
| style="background:lightblue;"|1
|colspan="2" 
|8.0
|0
|3
|-
|align="left"|Giffnock and Thornliebank
| style="background:#efe146;"|26.1
| style="background:#efe146;"|1
|22.2
|1
|25.1
|1
|19.9
|0
|6.7
|0
|3
|-
|align="left"|Clarkston, Netherlee and Williamwood
| style="background:#efe146;"|29.0
| style="background:#efe146;"|1
|16.8
|1
|23.5
|1
|20.7
|1
|10.0
|0
|4
|-
|align="left"|Newton Mearns South & Eaglesham
|24.3
|1
|19.1
|1
| style="background:lightblue;"|48.9
| style="background:lightblue;"|2
|colspan="2" 
|7.8
|0
|4
|- class="unsortable" class="sortbottom"
!align="left"| Total
!28.5
!6
!20.2
!5
!29.5
!5
!14.1
!2
!7.6
!0
!18
|}

Ward results

Barrhead, Liboside and Uplawmoor

† Greg Turner was suspended from the Conservative Party on 21 April 2022, prior to the election, after being linked to derogatory online remarks against Catholics. His name remained on the ballot paper, as the deadline for nominations had passed.

Newton Mearns North and Neilston

Giffnock and Thornliebank

Clarkston, Netherlee and Williamwood

Newton Mearns South and Eaglesham

Aftermath
After this election, a minority coalition was formed with the five Labour councillors and the two Independent councillors, David Macdonald and Danny Devlin. The SNP accused Labour of a 'backroom deal' with the Conservatives.

On 4 July 2022, Macdonald left the coalition, and the council's administration. Responding to a query on social media, he said: "The agreement I reached with the Labour group leader for my support to install a minority Labour, Independent administration was not going to be delivered. I lost trust and confidence and for that reason I could not, in good faith, continue."

References

East Renfrewshire Council elections
East Renfrewshire